CBS 17 may refer to one of the following television stations in the United States:

Currently affiliates
KSWL-LD in Lake Charles, Louisiana
WNCN in Raleigh/Durham, North Carolina
WXVT-LD in Cleveland, Mississippi (Mississippi Delta)

Formerly affiliated
KJTV/KPWR (now KGET-TV) in Bakersfield, California (1974 to 1984)
KRTV in Little Rock, Arkansas (1953 to 1954)
KVIQ-LD in Eureka, California (2008 to 2017)
WVXF in Charlotte Amalie, U.S. Virgin Islands (2001 to 2009)